The Federal Correctional Institution, Miami (FCI Miami) is a low-security United States federal prison for male inmates in Florida. It is operated by the Federal Bureau of Prisons (BOP), a division of the United States Department of Justice. The institution also has an adjacent satellite prison camp that houses minimum-security male offenders.

A significant portion of the inmates held at FCI Miami have been convicted in the United States District Court for the Southern District of Florida.

History
In 1976, FCI Miami served as a center for youth offenders which explains its campus-like architecture and the presence of a lake in the middle of its compound (the only BOP facility with such landscape feature).  In the late 1970s, and in response to Haitian and Cuban immigration patterns, the facility changed missions and became an immigration detention center. It is estimated that between 1977 - 1981, more than 70,000 Haitians (possibly up to 200,00)   and as many as 125,000 Cubans (Mariel Boatlift)  migrated to South Florida with many of them being detained at the facility until their legal status was clarified. The facility did not have nearly enough capacity to hold even a significant portion of the refugees, so the Bureau of Prisons, with the assistance of the military and other federal agencies, created detention camps inside and outside Florida to house them.

In the late 1980s, and in response to the drug wars that griped Miami, the facility changed missions and became an "administrative detention center" for the Bureau of Prisons, housing many of those suspected of participating in the drug wars.   With the new mission came a new name and the facility became known as the Metropolitan Correctional Center - Miami (MCC-Miami). The vast majority of those individuals charged would eventually be found guilty of participating in the illicit drug trade at which time they would be transferred to another federal facility to serve their sentences.

While the institution was still an administrative facility and called MCC - Miami, among the most notable inmates, in addition to Manuel Noriega, was 
Yahwen ben Yahweh.  Born Hulon Mitchell, Jr., he joined the Nation of Islam in the 1960s only to leave it some time later and become a faith-healing Christian preacher.  Some in his congregation believed he had a direct line to God and some thought he was God.  In 1978 he move his congregation to Liberty City, Florida where he brought together the city's Black Hebrew Israelite congregations and founded the Nation of Yahweh. The Nation of Yahweh became active in its new city and engaged in charitable activities and multiple business ventures.  All these activities won them praise around the city and on October 7, 1990, the mayor of Miami, Xavier Suárez, declared it to be "Yahweh ben Yahweh Day."  This award ceremony took place a month before Yahweh ben Yahweh and his organization were indicted and charged under the Racketeer Influenced and Corrupt Organizations Act (RICO).  Between 1990 and 2001, he and others from his congregation served eleven years of an eighteen-year sentence on a RICO conviction for conspiracy for their role in more than a dozen murders.

In 2000, the facility changed missions once again and became known as the Federal Correctional Institution - Miami (FCI-Miami).  It no longer would house inmates waiting for their cases to be heard in court but would instead detain inmates serving their sentences.  At times the facility has been considered a "low security facility" and other times a "medium security facility." It is presently considered to be a "low security" facility.

Extraordinary Incidents 

In 1986, the Federal Bureau of Investigation (FBI) thwarted a daring escape planned by two inmates at  MCC- Miami. Gary Wayne Betzner and Terry Jackson Briceno planned to be in the recreation area of their housing unit when a helicopter would fly overhead, drop a rope ladder, and help them escape. Instead, once the helicopter flew over them they spotted three FBI agents in the helicopter and several others on the grounds. In 1989, another inmate, Benjamin "Barry" Kramer attempted to escape by helicopter. Once again, this attempt failed when the helicopter struck a recreation fence and crashed.

On October 24, 1992 MCC - Miami was struck by Hurricane Andrew  effectively rendering it inoperable for one year. The BOP's minimum security facility (the "Camp") which had been located in Homestead, Fl, and also destroyed by Hurricane Andrew, was transferred to MCC Miami's extensive grounds during that year. In 1993 both facilities were re-opened.

Notable inmates (current and former)

See also
List of U.S. federal prisons
Federal Bureau of Prisons
Incarceration in the United States

References

Buildings and structures in Miami-Dade County, Florida
Prisons in Florida
Miami
1976 establishments in Florida